Alejandro Valencia (born 28 February 1991) is a Mexican actor and model.

Career start 
Born in the small city of Ario de Rosales, Valencia made his television career start after winning the Mr Model Mexico 2013 competition, appearing in a number of episodes of Como dice el dicho. And upon returning from the 2014 Mister International contest (in which he placed among the Top 10 finishers) held in Seoul, Korea, the six-foot-one-inch tall graduate of Televisa's Centro de Educación Artística began obtaining more exposure in prime-time Mexican telenovelas. Valencia was also appointed to represent his country in Mister World 2014, but due to an injury during one of his filming jobs, the Michoacán-native  was replaced by Jose Pablo Minor, who eventually ended as the first runner-up in that international event.

Filmography

Television

References

External links

1991 births
Living people
Mexican male telenovela actors
Male actors from Michoacán
Models from Michoacán
21st-century Mexican male actors